Fear of a Punk Planet is the third album by the southern California punk rock band The Vandals, originally released in 1990 by Triple X Records. It was their first album to include the lineup of Dave Quackenbush, Warren Fitzgerald, Joe Escalante and Josh Freese, solidifying the band's roster after several years of fluctuation. This lineup would remain intact for the rest of the band's career, and for this reason Fear of a Punk Planet is considered by many fans to be the first proper album by the "new" Vandals. The album returned the band to their punk rock sound, after having played mostly in a country style on their previous album Slippery When Ill. The band would stick to a punk rock formula throughout the rest of their career. The album's title called to mind the rap album Fear of a Black Planet by Public Enemy, released that same year. It featured guest appearances by Dweezil and Moon Unit Zappa, Scott Thunes and Kelsey Grammer. An independent music video was filmed for the album's first track, "Pizza Tran."

The album was re-released with bonus tracks in 2000 by the band's own label Kung Fu Records in order to celebrate its tenth anniversary.

All Music Guide published a mostly positive review by Victor W. Valdivia, who commented "Even if the constant juvenile humor grates after a while, the Vandals are still more composed and entertaining than most."

Reception

Track listing

Personnel
Dave Quackenbush - vocals
Warren Fitzgerald - guitar
Joe Escalante - bass
Josh Freese - Drums
Dweezil Zappa - lead guitar on "Hey Holmes!"
Moon Unit Zappa - female vocals on "Summer Lovin'"
Scott Thunes - bass on "Kill My Tenant"
Kelsey Grammer - piano and vocals on "Phone Machine"
DJ Gary - sampling on "The Rodge"

Album information
Record label:
original release: Triple X Records
Anniversary Edition re-release: Kung Fu Records
Recorded at Paramount Studios in Hollywood, California and Master Control in Burbank, California
Mixed by Gary McGachan and Andrew Ballard at Master Control Assistants.
Produced by Bob Casale
Art direction:
original release: Steve Martinez
re-release: Sergie
Cover art by Rudolph Schwarzkogler, courtesy of the Gallery Krinzinger in Vienna
Photographs by Mollye Moore, assisted by Elena Ray and Melody
All songs published by Puppety Frenchman publishing SESAC except "Teenage Idol" by Nelson Music ASCAP, "Summer Lovin'" by Edwin H. Morris Music ASCAP, and "Kokomo" by Buena Vista Music Co., Clairaudient Music Corp., Daywin Music Inc. & Spirit One Music.

References 

1990 albums
Triple X Records albums
The Vandals albums